Mobius Dick (2004) is a novel by Andrew Crumey. 
It features an alternate world in which Nazi Germany has invaded Great Britain and Erwin Schrödinger failed to find the wave equation that bears his name. This world becomes connected to our world due to experiments with quantum computers.

The science-fiction plot centres on a mysterious mountain hospital in the Scottish highlands. Interweaving tales re-write the historical stories of Robert Schumann's stay in a similar clinic in Endenich and Schrödinger's visit to the Alpine sanatorium of Arosa, both of which echo the situation in Thomas Mann's  The Magic Mountain. Connections are drawn from the tales of  E. T. A. Hoffmann, particularly The Life and Opinions of the Tomcat Murr.

English-language literature
2004 British novels
Novels by Andrew Crumey
British alternative history novels
Novels about World War II alternate histories
Picador (imprint) books